Goli Vrh is a small settlement south of Raka in the Municipality of Krško in eastern Slovenia. It lies just north of the A2 motorway from Ljubljana to Zagreb. The area is part of the traditional region of Lower Carniola. It is now included in the Lower Sava Statistical Region.

References

External links
Goli Vrh on Geopedia

Populated places in the Municipality of Krško